Bobby Yadav (born 22 December 1997) is an Indian cricketer. He made his Twenty20 debut for Uttar Pradesh in the 2018–19 Syed Mushtaq Ali Trophy on 21 February 2019.

References

External links
 

1997 births
Living people
Indian cricketers
Uttar Pradesh cricketers
Place of birth missing (living people)